Anthony Laird Shillinglaw (born 25 May 1937) is a former English cricketer.  Shillinglaw was a right-handed batsman who bowled right-arm medium pace.  He was born in Birkenhead, Cheshire.

Shillinglaw made his debut for Cheshire against the Lancashire Second XI in the 1959 Minor Counties Championship.  He played Minor counties cricket for Durham from 1959 to 1971, making 25 Minor Counties Championship appearances.  He made his List A debut against Surrey in the 1964 Gillette Cup.  He made 3 further List A appearances, the last of which came against Northamptonshire in the 1968 Gillette Cup.  In his 4 List A matches, he scored 65 runs at an average of 32.50, with a high score of 23 not out.  With the ball, he took 6 wickets at a bowling average of 21.33, with best figures of 2/21.

References

External links
Anthony Shillinglaw at ESPNcricinfo
Anthony Shillinglaw at CricketArchive

1937 births
Living people
Sportspeople from Birkenhead
English cricketers
Cheshire cricketers